Anna Kournikova (named Vbs.OnTheFly by its author, and also known as VBS/SST and VBS_Kalamar) was a computer virus that spread worldwide on the Internet in February 2001. The virus program was contained in an email attachment, purportedly an image of tennis player Anna Kournikova.

Background
The virus was created by 20-year-old Dutch student Jan de Wit, who used the pseudonym "OnTheFly", on 11 February 2001. It was designed to trick email users into clicking to open an email attachment ostensibly appearing to be an image of the professional tennis player Anna Kournikova, but instead hiding a malicious program. The virus arrived in an email with the subject line "Here you have, ;0)" and an attached file entitled AnnaKournikova.jpg.vbs. When opened in Microsoft Outlook, the file did not display a picture of Kournikova, but launched a viral VBScript program that forwarded itself to all contacts in the victim's address book.

De Wit created Anna Kournikova in a matter of hours using a simple online Visual Basic Worm Generator program written by an Argentinian programmer called [K]Alamar. "The young man had downloaded a program on Sunday, February 11, from the Internet and later the same day, around 3:00 p.m., set the virus loose in a newsgroup." The Anna Kournikova virus did not corrupt data on the infected computer, unlike the similar ILOVEYOU virus that struck a year earlier in 2000, yet infected the computers of millions of users and caused problems in email servers worldwide.

Conviction
David L. Smith (the author of the 1999 Melissa virus, who was in FBI custody at that time), assisted the FBI in tracking down De Wit's identity. De Wit turned himself in to the police in his hometown Sneek on 14 February 2001, after he posted a confession to a website and a newsgroup devoted to the tennis player (alt.binaries.anna-kournikova), dated 13 February. He admitted to the creation of the virus using a toolkit, and said that his motivations were to see whether the IT community had developed better system security in the aftermath of previous virus infections. He also attributed blame for the virus's rate of spreading on Kournikova's beauty, and blamed those who opened the email, writing: "it's their own fault they got infected."

A few days after the virus release, the mayor of Sneek, Sieboldt Hartkamp, made a tentative job offer to De Wit in the local administration's IT department, saying that the city should be proud to have produced such a talented young man.

De Wit was tried in Leeuwarden and was charged with spreading data into a computer network with the intention of causing damage, a crime that carried a maximum sentence of four years in prison and a fine of 100,000 guilders (then equivalent to US$41,300). His lawyers called for the dismissal of the charges against him, arguing that the virus caused minimal damage. The FBI submitted evidence to the Dutch court, suggesting that US$166,000 in damages had been caused by the virus. Denying any intent to cause damage, De Wit was sentenced to 150 hours of community service.

The 18-year-old Buenos Aires programmer who created the Worm Generator toolkit removed the application's files from his website later in February 2001. In an interview, he said that his friends had encouraged him to do so after hearing his pseudonym on television.

See also
Comparison of computer viruses
List of convicted computer criminals
Timeline of notable computer viruses and worms

References

Computer worms
Hacking in the 2000s
2001 in computing
Windows malware